Saada Mkuya Salum (born 1975) is a Tanzanian CCM politician and a nominated Member of Parliament. She is a former Minister of Finance.

Early life and education
She was educated at Lumumba Secondary School, and attained her Diploma in Business Studies from Stamford College in Malaysia. She graduated from The Open University of Tanzania in 2009 with a master's degree in Business and also attained her MBA from Heriot-Watt University. As of January 2014, she is pursuing her PhD in business administration from The Open University of Tanzania.

Political career
She was nominated as a Member of Parliament by President Kikwete in May 2012 and subsequently appointed as the Deputy Minister of Finance. In January 2014, Salum succeeded William Mgimwa as the 14th Minister of Finance.

References

External links
 

1975 births
Living people
Tanzanian Muslims
Chama Cha Mapinduzi MPs
Tanzanian MPs 2010–2015
Nominated Tanzanian MPs
Finance Ministers of Tanzania
Lumumba Secondary School alumni
Open University of Tanzania alumni
Alumni of Heriot-Watt University
Women government ministers of Tanzania
Female finance ministers